Dottie Golt Leonard Miller is an American business executive who heads companies that specialize in Christian music and other Christian products. She is a member of the Gospel Music Hall of Fame and the Southern Gospel Music Hall of Fame.

Early years
A native of Wilmington, Delaware, Miller is the daughter of William M. Golt and Dorothy Golt. She graduated from Mount Pleasant High School in 1963.

Career
Miller began her Christian and Gospel music career as a receptionist, radio promoter, and salesperson for Calvary Records and Windchime Records.

In 1981, helped by a modest investment by family members and a friend, Miller launched New Day Christian Distributors in her garage. Over time, the company added books, clothing, games, gifts, and toys and became "a major source of distribution for the Christian retail market." Recording labels distributed by New Day include Fuel, Daywind, Malaco, Reach, Tooth and Nail, Gotee, Fair Trade, GoDigiPath, Tyscot, Lunjeal, and Word/Curb.

In 1986, Miller and Ronnie Drake created Daywind Music Group, which comprises Daywind Music Publishing, Daywind Performance Tracks, Daywind Records, and Daywind Studios. Described in the trade publication Billboard as "one of the most successful companies in the Christian market", the company has released more than 5,500 performance soundtracks, 500 albums, and many print music pieces. Artists whose music has been supported by Daywind include The Blackwood Brothers, Brian Free and Assurance, Gold City, Mark Lowry, Crabb Family, Karen Peck and New River, Perrys, Legacy Five, Greater Vision, Wilburn and Wilburn, LeFevre Quart, The Sound, HighRoad, Tim Menzies, Jason Crabb, Joseph Habedank, Triumphant Quartet, and The Nelons. Daywind began producing the Live at Oak Tree and "Live at Daywind" series of DVDs of Christian performers, with the format derived from Miller's appreciation of music videos. The video recordings were featured on FamilyNet, Gospel Music Channel, and Inspo Network.

In 1990, Miller created Daywind Music Publishing, one of the top publishers in Christian music with a songwriter roster of 16 including Jason Cox, Gerald Crabb, Lee Black, Sue C. Smith, Karen Peck Gooch, Devin McGlamery, Bill Whyte, Dianne Wilkinson, and many more.

Miller has established Music Source Direct as a short-run duplication facility, and currently owns two recording studios.

Miller is one of the only female business executives to be inducted into the GMA Gospel Music Hall of Fame, as well as the SGMA Southern Gospel Hall of Fame.

Recognition
Honors given to Miller include the following:

2005 Lifetime Achievement Award from the Southern Gospel Music Guild. 
2013 Gospel Music Association's Lifetime Achievement Award.
2019 Induction into the Gospel Music Hall of Fame
2020 Induction into the Southern Gospel Music Hall of Fame.

References 

Year of birth missing (living people)
American women business executives
American women company founders
American company founders
American music publishers (people)
People from Wilmington, Delaware
Living people
21st-century American women